European route E86 is a road part of the International E-road network. It begins in Krystallopigi, Greece and ends in Gefyra, Greece.

The road follows: Krystallopigi - Florina - Edessa - Giannitsa - Gefyra.

External links 
 UN Economic Commission for Europe: Overall Map of E-road Network (2007)

86
E086